There are nineteen colleges and universities in Washington, D.C., that are listed under the Carnegie Classification of Institutions of Higher Education. These institutions include five research universities, four master's universities, and ten special-focus institutions. Sixteen of Washington, D.C.'s post-secondary institutions are private, of which three are for-profit. Only three of the city's post-secondary institutions listed under the Carnegie Classification of Institutions of Higher Education are public. In addition to the institutions listed under the Carnegie Classification of Institutions of Higher Education, Washington, D.C., has three additional private not-for-profit post-secondary institutions (Johns Hopkins University's Paul H. Nitze School of Advanced International Studies, NewU University, and St. Paul's College) and two additional public post-secondary institutions (National Defense University and the Inter-American Defense College).

Washington, D.C.'s oldest post-secondary institution is Georgetown University, founded in 1789. Georgetown University is also the oldest Jesuit and Catholic university in the United States. Founded in 1821, George Washington University is the city's largest institution of higher learning in terms of enrollment, as it had 25,653 students as of the spring of 2013. According to the United States Department of Education Institute of Education Sciences, Washington Theological Union is the city's smallest with an enrollment of 80. 

In total, there are six Catholic post-secondary institutions listed under the Carnegie Classification of Institutions of Higher Education in Washington, D.C.: Catholic University of America, Georgetown University, the Dominican House of Studies, the Pontifical John Paul II Institute for Studies on Marriage and Family at The Catholic University of America, Trinity Washington University, and the Washington Theological Union. In addition, Gallaudet University is a post-secondary institution for the deaf and hard of hearing, and its curriculum is officially bilingual in both English and American Sign Language.

The University of the District of Columbia is Washington, D.C.'s largest public university (with an enrollment of 5,110 students) and its oldest historically black university. It is also DC's sole land-grant university. The other HBCU in the district, a member of the Thurgood Marshall College Fund alongside UDC, is Howard University, one of the top-ranked HBCUs in the nation.

Washington, D.C., has three medical schools: George Washington University School of Medicine & Health Sciences, Georgetown University School of Medicine, and Howard University College of Medicine. There are six law schools that are accredited by the American Bar Association: the University of the District of Columbia David A. Clarke School of Law, Columbus School of Law (Catholic University of America), Howard University School of Law, George Washington University Law School, Georgetown University Law Center, and Washington College of Law (American University). Eighteen of Washington, D.C.'s post-secondary institutions are officially recognized by the Middle States Association of Colleges and Schools (MSA). Most are accredited by multiple agencies, such as the American Psychological Association (APA), the American Speech–Language–Hearing Association (ASHA), the Association of Theological Schools in the United States and Canada (ATS), the Commission on Collegiate Nursing Education (CCNE), and the National Council for Accreditation of Teacher Education (NCATE).

Institutions

Other active institutions

Active Institutions with satellite programs

Defunct institutions

See also
 Higher education in the United States
 List of college athletic programs in Washington, D.C.
 List of recognized higher education accreditation organizations
 Lists of American institutions of higher education

References
Explanatory notes

Citations

Bibliography

External links
 United States Department of Education listing of accredited institutions in Washington, D.C.

 Washington
Lists of universities and colleges in the United States by city

Universities and colleges